The 1977 Sacramento State Hornets football team represented California State University, Sacramento as a member of the Far Western Conference (FWC) during the 1977 NCAA Division II football season. Led by Glenn Brady in his second and final season as head caoch, Sacramento State compiled an overall record of 0–10–1 with a mark of 0–4–1 in conference play, placing last out of six team in the FWC. The team was outscored by its opponents 379 to 71 for the season and was shut out by scores of 56–0 against Louisiana Tech and 75–0 against Nevada. The Hornets played home games at Hornet Stadium in Sacramento, California.

Schedule

References

Sacramento State
Sacramento State Hornets football seasons
College football winless seasons
Sacramento State Hornets football